Ricardo Cardona (November 9, 1952 – October 11, 2015) was a Colombian boxer. He is the younger brother of former flyweight world champion, Prudencio Cardona.

Professional career
Cardona turned pro on September 15, 1973, with a decision over Osvaldo Rojas in Valencia, Venezuela. He won the Colombian super bantamweight title in 1976. On May 7, 1978, he won the WBA World super bantamweight title with a TKO over Hong Soo-hwan in Seoul, South Korea becoming Colombia’s third boxing champion, following Antonio Cervantes and Rodrigo Valdez. He successfully defended the title five times before losing to Leo Randolph in 1980. Cardona fought for four more years, going 5-5 before retiring in 1984 with a record of 26-10-1 (13 KOs).

Personal life
His brother, Prudencio Cardona, was also a well-known world champion boxer, making the Cardona brothers one of the small numbers of sibling couples to have reached world championship status in the sport. Ricardo Cardona died at Bonnadona Hospital in Barranquilla, Colombia, after a long bout with cancer.

See also
List of super-bantamweight boxing champions

References

External links

1952 births
2015 deaths
Colombian male boxers
Super-bantamweight boxers
World super-bantamweight boxing champions
World Boxing Association champions
People from Bolívar Department